The Crossroads Guitar Festival 2004 is a concert film, released by the British rock musician Eric Clapton. It documents live performances and interviews by various guitar players Clapton admires and is the first official Crossroads Guitar Festival. A previous benefit project titled In Concert: A Benefit for the Crossroads Centre at Antigua sometimes regarded the first festival of this standard. The video footage for the release was recorded between June 4 and 6, 2004 in Dallas, Texas. The DVD hit the international market on November 9 the same year and is distributed and licensed through Reprise and Warner Bros. Records.

Track listing

Disc 1
 Eric Clapton – "Cocaine"	
 Robert Lockwood Jr. – "Love in Vain Blues"	
 Eric Clapton, Robert Cray, Hubert Sumlin & Jimmie Vaughan	– "Killing Floor"	
 Eric Clapton, Robert Cray, Buddy Guy, Hubert Sumlin & Jimmie Vaughan – "Sweet Home Chicago"
 Eric Clapton, Robert Cray, Robert Randolph & Jimmie Vaughan – "Six Strings Down"	
 Eric Clapton, Robert Cray, Buddy Guy, B.B. King & Jimmie Vaughan – "Rock Me Baby"
 Dan Tyminski with Ron Block – "I Am A Man Of Constant Sorrow"
 Dan Tyminski With Ron Block – "Road To Nash Vegas"
 James Taylor with Jerry Douglas – "Copperline"
 James Taylor with Joe Walsh - "Steamroller"
 Vince Gill with Jerry Douglas - "Oklahoma Borderline"
 Vince Gill with Jerry Douglas – "What the Cowgirls Do"
 J. J. Cale with Eric Clapton – "After Midnight"
 J. J. Cale with Eric Clapton – "Call Me the Breeze"
 Robert Randolph and the Family Band – "The March"
 Doyle Bramhall II	– "Green Light Girl"
 Carlos Santana with Eric Clapton – "Jingo"
 John Mayer – "City Love"

Disc 2
 Vishwa Mohan Bhatt – "Rag Bihag"
 John McLaughlin – "Tones for Elvin Jones"
 Larry Carlton – "Josie"
 David "Honeyboy" Edwards – "Going Down Slow"
 Eric Clapton – "If I Had Possession Over Judgement Day"
 Robert Cray – "Time Makes Two"
 Jonny Lang – "Give Me Up Again"
 David Hidalgo – "Neighborhood"
 Steve Vai	– "I'm the Hell Outta Here"
 Eric Johnson – "Desert Rose"
 Joe Walsh	– "Funk 49"
 Joe Walsh – "Rocky Mountain Way"
 Eric Clapton – "I Shot the Sheriff"
 Eric Clapton – "Have You Ever Loved A Woman (Blues In C)"
 ZZ Top – "La Grange"
 ZZ Top – "Tush"

Chart positions

Weekly charts

Certifications

References

Eric Clapton video albums
Concert films
Warner Records video albums
2000s English-language films